Allograpta  is a very large and diverse genus of hoverflies present throughout the world except most of the palearctic region. The adults are brightly coloured flower pollinators and most larvae have a predatory feeding mode involving soft-bodied sternorrhynchans. Certain species have diverged from this and their larvae have been found to be leaf-miners, stem-borers or pollen-feeders.

Allograpta is currently being studied using both molecular and morphological methods to produce a robust phylogeny of the genus and its related genera. Preliminary studies show the genus to be monophyletic with the genera Sphaerophoria and Exallandra placed within which obviously complicates matters. A more complete review is needed before any major taxonomic changes can occur i.e. splitting the genus up or incorporating related genera, though the former subgenus Fazia was elevated to genus in 2020.

List of species by subgenus or species group

Subgenus Allograpta Osten Sacken, 1875

Allograpta obliqua species group

(Afrotropical)
A. borbonica Kassebeer, 2000
A. calopoides (Curran, 1938)
A. calopus (Loew, 1858)
A. fuscotibialis (Macquart, 1842)
A. hypoxantha (Bezzi, 1923)
A. nasuta (Macquart, 1842)
A. nigra (Keiser, 1971)
A. nummularia (Bezzi, 1920)
A. phaeoptera (Bezzi, 1920)
A. rediviva (Bezzi, 1915)
A. rufifacies (Keiser, 1971)
A. tenella (Keiser, 1971)
A. varipes (Curran, 1927)

(Oriental & Palearctic)
A. dravida Ghorpade, 1994
A. javana (Wiedemann, 1824)
A. kinabalensis (Curran, 1931)
A. maculipleura (Brunetti, 1913)
A. maritima Mutin, 1986
A. medanensis (Meijere, 1914)
A. obscuricornis Meijere, 1914
A. philippina Frey, 1946
A. purpureicollis (Frey, 1946)
A. robinsoni (Curran, 1928)

(Australasia & Oceania)
A. amphoterum (Bezzi, 1928)
A. atkinsoni (Miller, 1921)
A. australensis (Schiner, 1868)
A. buruensis Meijere, 1929
A. citronella (Shiraki, 1963)
A. distincta (Kertész, 1899)
A. flavofaciens (Miller, 1921)
A. hirsutifera (Hull, 1949)
A. hudsoni (Miller, 1921)
A. longulus (Shiraki, 1963)
A. neofasciata Thompson, 1989
A. pallida (Bigot, 1884)
A. pseudoropalus (Miller, 1921)
A. ropalus (Walker, 1849)
A. septemvittata (Shiraki, 1963)

(Nearctic & Neotropical)
A. aeruginosifrons (Schiner, 1868)
A. annulipes (Macquart, 1850)
A. aperta Fluke, 1942
A. bilineella Enderlein, 1938
A. browni Fluke, 1942
A. exotica (Wiedemann)[3]
A. falcata Fluke, 1942
A. hastata Fluke, 1942
A. hortensis (Pjilippi, 1865)
A. insularis Thompson, 1981
A. limbata (Fabricius, 1805)
A. neotropica Curran, 1936
A. nigripilosa (Hull, 1944)
A. obliqua (Say, 1823)
A. obscuricornis (Meijere, 1914)
A. philippina (Frey, 1946)
A. piurana Shannon, 1927
A. pulchra Shannon, 1927
A. radiata Bigot, 1857
A. robinsoniana Enderlein, 1938
A. splendens (Thomson, 1869)
A. tectiforma Fluke, 1942
A. teligera Fluke, 1942
A. trilimbata Bigot, 1889

Allograpta alamacula species group
A. alamacula Carver, 2003

Allograpta ventralis species group
A. dorsalis (Miller, 1924)
A. ventralis (Miller, 1921)

Subgenus Antillus Vockeroth, 1969
A. ascita (Vockeroth, 1969)

Subgenus Claraplumula Shannon, 1927
A. latifacies (Shannon, 1927)

Subgenus Rhinoprosopa Hull, 1942
A. aenea (Hull, 1937)
A. flavophylla (Hull, 1943)
A. lucifera (Hull, 1943)
A. neonasuta Thompson,
A. sycorax (Hull, 1947)

Subgenus Tiquicia Thompson, 2012
A. zumbadoi Thompson, 2000
A. nishida Mengual & Thompson, 2009

unranked
A. neosplendens Thompson, in litt.

References

Syrphini
Hoverfly genera
Diptera of North America
Diptera of South America
Diptera of Asia
Diptera of Australasia
Diptera of Africa
Taxa named by Carl Robert Osten-Sacken